Țuțora is a commune in Iași County, Western Moldavia, Romania. It is composed of three villages: Chiperești, Oprișeni and Țuțora. In 2002, it had a population of 2,119. The Battle of Țuțora took place here in 1620.

References

Communes in Iași County
Localities in Western Moldavia
Populated places on the Prut